Bozidar Brazda (born 1972 in Cambridge, Canada) is an artist. He lives and works in New York City.

Biography
Brazda is a Canadian-born, New York-based artist. He is the son of folk musician Andrew Brazda and the grandson of the award-winning journalist Andrej Brázda-Jankovský.

Brazda plays in the post-punk band Diet Choke with model and singer Ruby Aldridge and artist Shawn Kuruneru.

Work and Exhibitions
Brazda's work consists of silk screens, wall texts, and audio recordings. In recent years the artist has moved away from his earlier East/West "narrative-driven" installations to
a minimalist, Pop Art that reflects his interest in the 'edges of popular culture'.

Bozidar Brazda has exhibited at international museums and galleries including Whitney Museum of American Art (NY), MoMA PS1 (NY), The Kitchen (NY), David Zwirner Gallery, 
Reena Spaulings (NY), and Martos (NY).

His work has appeared in Artforum, Flash Art, artnet.com, The New York Times, Architectural Digest (France), Art in America, Interview Magazine, Vogue.com, and Maximum Rock N Roll.

He has written for artnet.com, Flash Art, and dazed.com.

References

External links
Bozidar Brazda on ArtFacts.net
Bozidar Brazda on ArtNet.com
Further information and images from the Saatchi Gallery
Holland Cotter, Art in Review; Bozidar Brazda, The New York Times, Nov 5, 2004.
Brian Sholis, Bozidar Brazda: Haswellediger & Co. Gallery, ArtForum, Oct 2006.
Gartenfeld, Alex "Bozidar Brazda Sinks and Swims", "artinamerica.com", Sept 14, 2009.

Canadian multimedia artists
Living people
1972 births
Canadian contemporary artists